Jerome Hunter (born January 14, 1942, Spartanburg, South Carolina) is an American jazz double-bassist.

Jerome learned to play guitar in his youth but switched to stand-up bass at age 12, studying formally in both classical and jazz styles. He worked early in the 1960s with Ray Bryant, Roy Haynes, and Philly Joe Jones, then moved increasingly toward free jazz, playing with Marzette Watts in 1964 and Byard Lancaster in 1966-1967. Following this he worked with Ahmed Abdullah, Dorothy Donegan, Johnny Hammond, J. R. Mitchell, Sam Rivers, Sonny Sharrock, and Grover Washington, Jr. He played with Jamaaladeen Tacuma in 1993.

Discography

With Ahmed Abdullah
 Life's Force (About Time, 1979)
 Live at Ali's Alley (Cadence, 1980)

With Byard Lancaster
 It's Not Up to Us (Vortex, 1966 [1968])
 Live at Macalester College (Dogtown, 1972) with J. R. Mitchell

References
Gary W. Kennedy, "Jerome Hunter". The New Grove Dictionary of Jazz. 2nd edition, ed. Barry Kernfeld.

1942 births
Living people
American jazz double-bassists
Male double-bassists
Musicians from South Carolina
21st-century double-bassists
21st-century American male musicians
American male jazz musicians